This is a list of characters from the visual novel, anime, and manga series Demonbane, which incorporates elements of mecha and the Cthulhu Mythos.

Main characters

Kurou Daijūji 

 (anime), Healthy Tarō (PC)
Kurou is the protagonist of Demonbane.  He was enrolled as an archaeology student at the Miskatonic University but used this as a cover for his true major in sorcery under the tutelage of Dr. Henry Armitage.  During an attempt to break into the library to read one of the forbidden grimoires, he was attacked by Wilbur Whateley and almost killed, causing him to distance himself from the occult and drop out of the university entirely.  He continued to work as a private investigator but was financially poor until the day he was hired by the Hadou Financial Group to acquire a grimoire. In his search, he encounters Al-Azif and circumstances force him into a contract with her, becoming the pilot of the imitation Deus Machina, .  Kurou has a strong sense of justice and morality, claiming that there is no rationale behind his desire to aid and protect others beyond the fact that it would leave him with lingering regrets if he simply abandoned them, a feeling that he describes as "a bad aftertaste".  After encountering the inhumanity of Master Therion, he comes to hate the man with a passion, fuelling his determination to destroy the Black Lodge

The power of the Necronomicon allows Kurou to transform into a magius, enhancing his physical and magical abilities to superhuman levels and giving him the ability to fly.  The Necronomicon itself is an extensive record of matters relating to the Great Old Ones and harnessing their power in the form of spells, such as magical webbing (Atlach-Nacha), the creation of illusions (the Mirror of Nitocris) and summoning powerful magical weapons (the Scimitar of Barzai). Kurou later acquires a pair of handguns that act as conduits for the power of two Great Old Ones, Cthugha and Ithaqua. Cthugha fires bullets that explode in sorcerous fire while Ithaqua fires bullets that magically track the target's weak points, homing in on them and changing trajectory to avoid the target's defences.

Kurou's Deus Machina is Demonbane, a man-made machine that is almost equal in power to a true Deus Machina. After becoming associated with the Necronomicon it is capable of channeling all of Kurou's spells and weapons on a larger scale. In addition, it possesses Timaeus and Critias, two devices built into its shinguards that can distort time and space, granting Demonbane increased speed and maneuverability as well as short-range teleportation, and can be employed in one of its signature attacks, the Atlantis Strike. However its most well-known attack is the Lemuria Impact, a zero-point sublimation spell that generates infinite heat and pressure. The destructive power of this spell is such that it can only be used with Ruri's approval, via the Naacal Code. Over the course of the story, Demonbane gains the ability to fly and to use the Shining Trapezohedron, an artifact with the power to cut through as well as seal dimensional barriers.

Kurou's name is the Japanese romanization of Titus Crow, the main character in a set of horror fiction novels written by Brian Lumley that form part of the Cthulhu Mythos.

Al-Azif 

Al Azif makes a pact with Kurou after being chased by the Black Lodge, allowing him access to her near limitless power. When Kurou becomes a magius, Al changes into a chibi version of herself; similarly, when he gains access to the Demonbane, Al serves as the Deus Machina's secondary pilot. Normally direct, bold and upbeat, Al is also impatient with those who are slow to act in danger, yet realizes whenever she and Kurou are outclassed by more powerful members of the Black Lodge. Unlike her previous masters, she confides to Kurou he is the first person to treat her like a person, rather than a weapon. In the anime she falls in love with Kurou.
The name "Al Azif" is Arabic in origin, meaning "that nocturnal sound (made by insects) supposed to be the howling of demons". According to the Lovecraftian mythos, Al Azif was the original name of the Necronomicon.

Ruri Hadou

 (anime), Anna Akashi (PC)
The 16-year-old head of the Hadou Financial Group, Ruri wields considerable power in Arkham City. After her parents were assassinated by agents of the Black Lodge, she was taken care of by her grandfather, . She cared deeply for him and sought to live up to his legacy by piloting Demonbane in battle. To this end, she employs Kurou to search for a suitable grimoire, but circumstances place the controls in his hands instead. Though she is initially bitter that someone outside the Hadou Group is piloting her grandfather's legacy, she swallows her pride and directs Demonbane's support crew from an underground command center.

In her own route, Ruri comes to depend on Kurou more as time goes on and eventually realises that her resentment is unwarranted, given that she is not suited to front line combat.  After he is injured defending Arkham's underground shelters from the Black Lodge, Ruri makes a contract with Al and attempts to fight in his stead.  Although she is still no match for the Anticross, she is instrumental in resuscitating Kurou and tipping the balance of the battle. Before Kurou pursues Master Therion, she confesses her love and promises to wait for him to return, though for a whole year there is no news.  Unbeknownst to her, Kurou is defeated when Nyarlathotep is able to exploit Al's growing jealousy to distract her at a critical moment.  Al is still able to cross time in order to give word of his last moments to Ruri, but she refuses to accept defeat and renews her contract, which draws her through dimensions to the scene of the final battle.  With her help, Kurou is able to defeat Master Therion and restore the timeline to its proper state. Since the Black Lodge is erased from history, Ruri loses her memories of the story. She decides to attend Miskatonic University and ends up meeting Kurou again, while Al watches on, accepting that she cannot be together with him.

Ruri generally coordinates the efforts of Demonbane's support team, consisting of her personal maids, Makoto, Sonia and Chiaki, from their secret underground base.  As the head of the Hadou Financial Group she possesses excellent leadership and organisational skills.  When she makes a contract with Al, she gains the ability to transform into a magius and has all the same abilities as Kurou, though she has no combat experience. Ruri proves unable to wield the Scimitar of Barzai with one hand, for instance, and generally uses either Cthugha or Ithaqua but not both. She is also capable of piloting Demonbane.

Leica Crusade

 (anime), Mina Motoyama (PC)
A nun at a local church, she looks after Kurou whenever he drops by for food, due to his lack of finances, although any payment he receives in his work is automatically given to her. Kurou met Leica when he first moved to Arkham City and she sheltered him from the elements for a time.  The two of them then struck up an easy friendship with Kurou returning from time to time to play with George, Colin and Alison, the three orphans that live in her care. While compassionate, Leica is also cunning and perceptive, able to deduce that Kurou is getting himself into dangerous situations.

Leica is typically a supporting character but becomes a protagonist in her own route where it is revealed that she was a test subject in the Moonchild Project, an experiment conducted by the future Anticross, Vespasianus, in order to create the C Priestess, a being that was capable of interfacing with and controlling Cthulhu. The test subjects were artificially enhanced in various ways, with Leica becoming a living weapon with compressed magical spells embedded in her body that could be deployed at will.  Eventually she escaped and hid among the population of Arkham City, posing as a nun while fighting against the Black Lodge as the hero Metatron.  At the end of her route, she is transported along with Demonbane through time and space, fighting against the Liber Legis before a final showdown with the black angel, Sandalphon, who consistently opposed her.  After time and space reassert themselves, she is transported by Al back to Arkham City with her past as Metatron and her association with the Moonchild Project wiped clean.  Abiding by Kurou's request, Al allows him to retain his memories of the previous timeline and he continues to pursue a relationship with Leica.

As Metatron, Leica tries to dissuade Kurou from confronting the Black Lodge and does not believe herself to be the hero of justice that Arkham's population view her as. She possesses a suit of white, angelic armour that protects her from damage and allows her to fly.  The armour is also equipped with a voice scrambler that hides her true identity.  Metatron can also manifest wrist-mounted blades and beam cannons on her forearms, and is also a proficient hand-to-hand fighter.  As befits a transforming heroine, she also has a signature attack, the Slash Cross. Later in the story she acquires the Hunting Horror, a flying motorcycle created by Doctor West that incorporates pages of the Pnakotic Manuscripts, giving it some of the characteristics of a Deus Machina. The Hunting Horror can only be driven effectively by an individual that has been artificially enhanced, such as Metatron or Sandalphon.

"Metatron" is the name of an angel prevalent in medieval Jewish mystical texts and other occult sources. George is a reference to George Hay, an editor of a version of the Necronomicon, while Colin is derived from Colin Wilson, a British philosopher who wrote several stories behind the Cthulhu Mythos. Alison is named after Alison Hay, the daughter of George Hay.

Supporting Characters

Winfield

 (anime), Hayato Jūmonji (PC)
Ruri's personal bodyguard and head butler of the Hadou Estate, this polite, well-mannered man possesses great skill in boxing, able to stay on par with even the deadliest members of the Black Lodge. Winfield's name is a homage to Winfield Scott Lovecraft, the father of horror fiction author H. P. Lovecraft.

Black Lodge

Master Therion

 (anime), Hikaru (PC)
Current head of the Black Lodge titled Grandmaster, this youth with a contemptuous, bored expression cares little about those who cannot match his vast, mystical power, thus allows Kurou to survive their many scuffles so as to provide him a challenge and amusement. Master Therion also controls the Deus Machina Liber Legis.
"Therion" is the Greek word for "wild animal" or "beast", specifically the "Beast of the Apocalypse", while the name "Master Therion" is a pseudonym of British occultist Aleister Crowley.

Etheldreda

 (anime)
Unlike the outspoken Al Azif, she is calm, collected and quiet, completely obedient to her master. Etheldreda is named after Aleister Crowley's dog.

Anticross
The  is a group of the seven powerful sorcerers and upper echelons within the Black Lodge, they answer directly to Master Therion, but are not above achieving their personal goals. Each of their names is taken from emperors of the Ancient Roman Empire.

 (anime)
Master Therion's right-hand man and the self-proclaimed "Emperor of the Earth" is the leader of the Anticross. He owns the grimoire  and controls the Deus Machina Legacy of Gold. In the game, his form is the one Nia takes in response to losing to Kurou and Al.

 (anime)
A four-armed samurai, Titus carries the grimoire  and takes to the field of battle in the Deus Machina Ogre.

 (anime)
A shrouded figure clad in black and red-striped robes, Tiberius is nothing more than a meager corpse, with his skeletal face covered by a lizard-like mask reflecting his current mood: green for content, red for anger and blue for agony. Sadistic and greatly delights in others' pain, he is the owner of the grimoire  and the Deus Machina Belzebuth.

 (anime), Kenta Miyake (Super Robot Wars UX)
A tall, powerful individual who hides his human face behind a skull mask, he is often seen alongside fellow Anticross member Claudius. Caligula has the grimoire  and controls the Deus Machina Kraken.

 (anime), Yuka Imai (PS2 game and Super Robot Wars UX)
Dressed in modern sports clothing, the mischievous, childish Claudius is agile, but rash in his decisions. He is the master of the grimoire  and controls the Deus Machina Lord Byakhee

 (anime)
A red-haired man dressed in grey, Vespasianus has a tendency to repeat his words. He acquired the grimoire  and is the pilot of the Deus Machina Cykranosh.

 (anime), Ari Hinohara (Super Robot Wars UX)
With a child-like appearance and known as "the greatest and most wicked magician" in the world, Nero is the only female  of the Anticross, with the grimoire  and the Deus Machina Nameless One at her disposal. In order to deceive Kurou, Nero feigns amnesia and gains his trust by developing a second personality called .
The term "ennea" may refer to the "Enneagram of Personality", a system describing nine distinct personality types and their interrelationships.

Doctor West 

 (anime), Prof. Shiryū (PC)
A flamboyant, eccentric mad scientist of the Black Lodge, he works for the organization to advance his research in mechanics and weaponry. Occasionally seen with an electric guitar, he serves as a source of comic relief for the series, due to his propensity for getting into various accidents and defeats at the hands of the Hadou Financial Group. Unlike other members of the Black Lodge, Doctor West does not possess any magical abilities, thus resorts to a simple assortment of machine guns and rocket launchers. However, he does construct a few Destroyer Robots to combat the Demonbane, in their initial engagements.
His name is perhaps derived from Herbert West, a character in the short story Herbert West–Reanimator by H.P. Lovecraft.

Elsa 

 (anime), Hina Kamimura (PC)
One of Doctor West's creations, Elsa is a gynoid, built to be stronger and faster than an ordinary human, equipped with a pair of tonfas. Although she recognizes Kurou as her enemy, following an encounter where he saves her, Elsa admits her love to Kurou, much to his confusion. She ends most of her sentences with the suffix "robo".
Elsa's name is probably derived from Elsa Sullivan Lanchester, the star of the movie Bride of Frankenstein.

Sandalphon 

A black angel who possesses equipment similar to that of Metatron and invariably appears to confront the white angel. He is a member of the Black Lodge's inner circle but stands apart from all of them and shows little interest in fighting weaklings. Sandalphon typically plays a minor role in the story but becomes the primary antagonist in Leica's route.

Although he was male and therefore did not have a real prospect of becoming the C Priestess, he was still experimented upon and had a magical dynamo implanted into his body, giving him superhuman combat ability. Although he did not know what the ultimate fate of the test subjects would be, Ryuuga still distrusted the scientists and planned to take Leica and escape. He loved the sky and his dream was to fly with the birds. Ryuuga's first escape attempt was successful but he was overpowered by Vespasianus, while his second attempt was cut short when Leica was manipulated into attacking him. He sustained severe injuries and was placed into a coma. Ryuuga's memory of the incident was distorted and he believes Leica killed him, causing the birth of a hatred that would eventually turn into an all-consuming obsession with killing Metatron. Vespasianus provided him with his equipment and gave him the name Sandalphon, making him an agent of the Black Lodge.

Sandalphon clashes with Metatron repeatedly over the course of the story and in Leica's route, he is drawn into the scene of the final battle along with Demonbane and Liber Legis.  Without Master Therion, Etheldreda is incapable of fighting Demonbane on even terms and attempts to take control of Sandalphon to use as a pilot but he turns on her, consuming her and gaining the full knowledge of the Pnakotic Manuscripts.  With it he takes control of Liber Legis and battles Demonbane. He is defeated but continues to battle Metatron on foot. Leica deals him a fatal blow and he dies in her arms, in a state of peace, if not sanity. In all other routes he is killed by Metatron in a duel near the end of the story.

Sandalphon is a master martial artist and the magical dynamo implanted into his body gives him superhuman strength. In addition his armour provides him with enhanced durability, flight, and a voice scrambler that hides his identity. His pathological hatred of Metatron grants him a measure of resistance to pain and allows him to endure otherwise crippling blows. When he consumes Etheldreda, Sandalphon becomes capable of piloting Liber Legis and using all of its arsenal.

The name "Sandalphon" comes from the name of an archangel who is noted by some texts during the Midrashic period as the twin brother of Metatron.

Nya 

 (anime)
A mysterious bespectacled woman in black (Nya) or a black man in a suit with odd earrings (Naia), Nya/Naia first appears as the owner of an old book shop when Kurou is hired by the Hadou Financial Group to search for a grimoire. In reality, Nya/Naia is Nyarlathotep, one of the cosmic Outer Gods who orchestrates most of the events triggered in Zanma Taisei Demonbane.

Characters that appear in other media

A mysterious girl in red who possesses the power of blood magic, she appears before Kurou and Al and reveals she is the blood edition of the Necronomicon. She summons the Deus Machina Demonbane Blood to do battle with Kuzaku. She is also another possibility of Kuzaku but was never born due to the fact her future was not reached by Kurou and Al Azif. She despises her mother and loves her father to point of wanting to switch places with her mother. Another Blood only appears in Kishin Hishou Demonbane.

The former master of Al Azif, he is the pilot of the Deus Machina Aeon. A young Arabian gentleman obsessed with revenge, Azrad appears in the prequel novel Kishin Taidou Demonbane and the Kishin Hishou Demobane visual novel. It is possible his name is derived from H.P. Lovecraft's character Abdul Alhazred, who is credited for authoring the Kitab al-Azif, better known as the Necronomicon.

This handsome young man with long, braided hair possesses the aura of a knight. He chases after a girl in red and pilots the Deus Machina Demonbane Two-Sword. After he was born, he was left in the care of Ruri Hadou in the "original world" the visual novel took place in. He has a grudge towards his father for "throwing him away".

The professor at the Miskatonic University, he is occasionally seen wearing a black coat and shades. Being the author of the Celaeno Fragments grimoire, he owns its original copy, which can summon the Deus Machina Ambrose, a more powerful version of the Lord Byakhee. Hazuki is the human appearance of the Celaeno Fragments and addresses him as "father". Both Professor Shrewsbury and Hazuki only appear in Kishin Hishou Demonbane.
Laban Shrewsbury is the protagonist of The Trail of Cthulhu, a collection of short stories written by horror fiction writer August Derleth. The word "hazuki" or "葉月" is the name of the eighth month of the Japanese calendar.

Lists of literary characters
Lists of anime and manga characters
Lists of visual novel characters